(Archibald) Ronald Primrose, Lord Dalmeny (1 August 1910 – 11 November 1931), was an English-born Scottish cricketer.

Early life and career 
Always known by his second forename, Ronald, Primrose was born in London and was styled Lord Dalmeny as the heir apparent of his father Harry Primrose, 6th Earl of Rosebery. Educated at Eton and New College, Oxford, Primrose played in the Eton v Harrow cricket match at Lord's in 1928.

Like his father, he represented Middlesex and he also played a single match for Oxford University. He played in three first-class matches between 1929 and 1931, as a right-handed batsman and as a right-arm fast-medium bowler. He died in Oxford from blood poisoning in 1931 at the age of 21, predeceasing his father.

Notes

External links

1910 births
1931 deaths
Anglo-Scots
British courtesy barons and lords of Parliament
Heirs apparent who never acceded
Middlesex cricketers
Cricketers from Greater London
Scottish cricketers
Scottish people of German-Jewish descent
Oxford University cricketers
Deaths from sepsis
People educated at Eton College
Alumni of New College, Oxford
Ronald